Antigua and Barbuda participated at the 2018 Summer Youth Olympics in Buenos Aires, Argentina from 6 October to 18 October 2018.

Athletics
Girls
Track

Field

Sailing

Antigua and Barbuda qualified one boat based on its performance at the North American and Caribbean IKA Twin Tip Qualifiers.

 Boys' IKA Twin Tip Racing - 1 boat

Swimming

Boys

Girls

References

2018 in Antigua and Barbuda sport
Nations at the 2018 Summer Youth Olympics
Antigua and Barbuda at the Youth Olympics